Alluvial City is an Isleño fishing community in St. Bernard Parish, Louisiana, United States. The community is located on the western bank of Bayou la Loutre. Alluvial City is connected to the neighboring community of Yscloskey by the Bayou la Loutre lift bridge, also known as the Yscloskey bridge.

In popular culture 
The community was the inspiration for the literary work Alluvial Cities: Poems.

References 

Populated places in St. Bernard Parish, Louisiana